Spolebach is a river of Hesse, Germany. It flows into the Elbe (a tributary of the Eder) near Naumburg.

See also
List of rivers of Hesse

References

Rivers of Hesse
Rivers of Germany